Edvaldo is a given name. It may refer to:

 Edvaldo Alves de Santa Rosa (1934-2002), known as Dida, Brazilian football attacking midfielder
 Edvaldo Izidio Neto (1934-2002), known as Vavá, Brazilian football striker
 Edvaldo Oliveira (born 1963), Brazilian boxer
 Edvaldo Santos (born 1966), Brazilian weightlifter
 Edvaldo (footballer, born 1966), Edvaldo Teles Alves, Brazilian football forward
 Edvaldo (footballer, born 1974), Edvaldo Gonçalves Pereira, Brazilian football striker
 Edvaldo Valério (born 1978), Brazilian swimmer
 Edvaldo Gonzaga (born 1982), Brazilian boxer
 Edvaldo Ferreira (born 1990), Angolan handball player

See also
Edivaldo